Phylomictis monochroma is a moth in the family Depressariidae. It was described by Oswald Bertram Lower in 1892. It is found in Australia, where it has been recorded from South Australia.

References

Moths described in 1892
Phylomictis